is a Japanese politician currently serving as a member of the House of Councillors for the Saitama at-large district after winning a by-election in 2019. He has signed the Taxpayer Protection Pledge, signaling his opposition to any and all tax increases. He previously served as governor of Saitama Prefecture from 2003 to 2019, when he subsequently retired.

References

External links 
 Official website 

1948 births
Living people
People from Fukuoka
Waseda University alumni
Members of the House of Representatives (Japan)
Japanese anti-communists
Hosei University alumni
Governors of Saitama Prefecture